"Yee" is the debut single by American DJ and producer Deorro. It charted in a number of countries particularly in Europe. The song appeared on several dance compilations in 2013.

Charts

References

2013 debut singles
2013 songs
Deorro songs